Stigma is a 1972 American drama film. It was produced by Charles Moss, while David E. Durston was both the writer and the director. Prominent themes in the film include racism and sexually transmitted disease. It stars Philip Michael Thomas in an early screen appearance, twelve years before he starred in the popular 1980s TV show Miami Vice.

Plot
Set in a remote California community, the film follows a doctor (Philip Michael Thomas) who learns a super form of VD is appearing among the residents. He and a few others must race against time to find the carrier before others fall victim.

See also
 List of American films of 1972

References

1972 drama films
1972 films
American drama films
1970s English-language films
Films about racism in the United States
Films about sexuality
Films directed by David E. Durston
1970s American films